The 2014 AFC Women's Asian Cup, the 18th edition of the competition, was a women's association football tournament competed by national teams in Asian Football Confederation (AFC). It served as the qualification for the 2015 FIFA Women's World Cup. It was played from 14 to 25 May 2014 in Vietnam.

Reigning world champions Japan defeated the reigning Asian champions Australia 1–0 in the final to secure their first continental title.

Qualification

The final tournament was competed by eight teams, four of which were automatically qualified though their 2010 placement, while the others were determined via a qualification tournament.

North Korea was banned from the tournament due to the sanction on their doping cases in 2011 FIFA Women's World Cup. Hosts Vietnam had to play the qualifying round; in case of a non-qualification, another host would have been chosen.

Qualified teams

Venues
The competition was played in two venues in Thủ Dầu Một and Ho Chi Minh City.

Squads

Group stage
The eight teams were drawn into two groups of four teams. Each team then played the others in their group once. The top two teams advanced to the semifinals, and the two third-placed teams played a play-off match for fifth place and the final World Cup qualifying spot. The draw was held on 29 November 2013.

In the group stage, teams tied in the points were ranked by the following criteria:
 Greater number of points between the teams concerned,
 Goal differences between the teams concerned,
 Number of goals between the teams concerned,
 Goal differences between in all round-robin matches,
 Number of goals between in all round-robin matches,
 Penalty shoot-out (in case just two teams playing the final match tied in the all conditions above),
 Fewer yellow and red card points in all group matches (1 point for each yellow card, 3 points for each red card as a consequence of two yellow cards, 3 points for each direct red card, 4 points for each yellow card followed by a direct red card), and
 Drawing of lots.
All times are local (UTC+7).

Group A

Group B

Fifth place play-off
Thailand won the play-off and thus qualified for the 2015 FIFA Women's World Cup

Knockout stage
In the knockout stage (including the fifth place match), extra time and penalty shoot-out are used to decide the winner if necessary.

All times are local (UTC+7).

Semi-finals

Third place match

Final

Awards

Goalscorers

Tournament teams ranking

References

External links
 RSSSF.com

 
2014
2015 FIFA Women's World Cup qualification
Women's Asian Cup
2014 in women's association football
2014
2014 in Vietnamese football
2014 in Japanese women's football
2013–14 in Australian women's soccer
2014 in Chinese football
2014 in South Korean football
2014 in Burmese football
2014 in Thai football
2013–14 in Jordanian football
May 2014 sports events in Asia